Alison Bell is an Australian stage, film and television actress and writer.

Early life and education

Born in Young, New South Wales and educated in Canberra, she completed an Arts/Law degree at the Australian National University before undertaking an acting course at the Victorian College of the Arts, where she graduated in 2004.

Career

Bell has worked in television, documentary film and theatre. She is perhaps best known for her performances on the ABC TV series Laid, for which she was nominated for an AACTA Award and in the Sydney Theatre Company's production of Doubt, for which she won a Helpmann Award.

In 2017 she performed in the acclaimed ABC TV series The Letdown. She starred as Audrey, the main character, and also served as writer and co-creator of the series.

Filmography

References

External links
 
 All hail our great stage actresses

1978 births
Living people
Australian television actresses
Australian stage actresses
Helpmann Award winners
Victorian College of the Arts alumni
Actresses from Canberra
Actresses from Melbourne
21st-century Australian actresses
University of Melbourne women
People from Young, New South Wales